Malaysia is a Megadiverse country, of which two thirds is covered in forest which is believed to be 130million years old. It is composed of a variety of types, although they are mainly dipterocarp forests. There are an estimated 8,500 species of vascular plants in Peninsular Malaysia, with another 15,000 in the East.  The forests of East Malaysia are estimated to be the habitat of around 2,000 tree species, and are one of the most biodiverse areas in the world, with 240 different species of trees every hectare.

Plants
Areca gurita
Areca triandra
Bamboo orchid
Dacrydium gibbsiae
 Dipterocarpus acutangulus
 Dipterocarpus caudatus
 Dipterocarpus confertus
 Dipterocarpus conformis
 Dipterocarpus coriaceus
 Dipterocarpus cornutus
 Dipterocarpus costulatus
 Dipterocarpus crinitus
 Dipterocarpus dyeri
 Dipterocarpus elongatus
 Dipterocarpus eurynchus
 Dipterocarpus geniculatus
 Dipterocarpus glabrigemmatus
 Dipterocarpus globosus
 Dipterocarpus gracilis
 Dipterocarpus hasseltii
 Dipterocarpus humeratus
 Dipterocarpus kerrii
 Dipterocarpus lamellatus
 Dipterocarpus ochraceus
 Dipterocarpus retusus
 Dipterocarpus sarawakensis
 Dipterocarpus semivestitus
 Dipterocarpus validus
 Dipterocarpus verrucosus
Durian
Nepenthes rajah
Rafflesia arnoldii
Rafflesia kerrii
Ridleyandra chuana
Vietnamese White Pine

See also

 
 
 Wildlife of Malaysia

References

 
Plants